The 61st Mobil 1 12 Hours of Sebring was an endurance sports car race held on March 16, 2013 at the Sebring International Raceway in Florida, United States. It was the last edition under the American Le Mans Series rules, marking the last year for the P1/LMP1 class at Sebring. The 2014 event was raced under the United SportsCar Racing brand.

Qualifying

Qualifying result
Pole position winners in each class are marked in bold.

Race

Race result
Class winners in bold.  Cars failing to complete 70% of their class winner's distance are marked as Not Classified (NC).

References

12 Hours of Sebring
Sebring
Sebring
Sebring